Henry Leslie (1775 – 24 Jan 1848) was Dean of Connor from 1825 to 1838.

References

1848 deaths
Alumni of Trinity College Dublin
Irish Anglicans
Deans of Connor
1775 births